Missing is a 2017 chamber opera with a libretto by Marie Clements and music by Brian Current. Co-commissioned by Pacific Opera Victoria and City Opera Vancouver, its topic is missing and murdered Indigenous women.

Development

The libretto for the work was developed by Marie Clements prior to the selection of the composer. Four different composers were asked to set a portion of this libretto, and their settings were anonymized and sung before a jury to select the work's ultimate composer (Brian Current).

The compositional style is spare, reminiscent of a "chamber music suite". It "eschews familiar operatic conventions such as showy arias, huge choruses and a linear plot". The opera is in English and Gitxsan, an indigenous language spoken in the traditional territory along much of the Highway of Tears.

Performance history
The opera's unofficial premiere in November 2017 was before the "community of the missing" in the Downtown Eastside of Vancouver, one of the opera's two settings. This was followed by a five-night run in each of Vancouver and Victoria later in the month. The show was directed by renowned Canadian director Peter Hinton.

Anchorage Opera presents the American premiere in March 2023.

Synopsis
The opera presents a dual narrative. The primary narrative focuses on Ava, a young white woman who is thrown into a tree during a car crash and sees the body of an indigenous woman known as "Native Girl". This experience makes such an impression on Ava that she adopts many elements of Gitxsan culture, and later sees the murder of Native Girl in her dreams. The secondary narrative focuses on the grief of Native Girl's brother and mother.

Reception
A review in Vancouver Magazine states that Missing "lays the foundation for a bridge between two cultural solitudes that must work together... to give birth to a new Canada". According to Opera Canada, "As an opera, Missing is under-written. As an important piece of theatre that builds over its short 80 minutes to a shatteringly emotional conclusion... [it] is something every Canadian should see".

References

2017 operas
Chamber operas
Operas set in the 21st century
English-language operas
Multiple-language operas
Operas
Works about missing people